Mimetaxalus is a genus of longhorn beetles of the subfamily Lamiinae, containing the following species:

 Mimetaxalus densepunctatus Breuning, 1957
 Mimetaxalus ochreoapicalis Breuning, 1971

References

Desmiphorini